Ralph Reed is an American political consultant, known as the first head of the Christian Coalition.

Ralph Reed may also refer to:

Ralph Reed (baseball), American baseball player better known as Ted Reed
Ralph Reed (American Express), former CEO of American Express

See also
Ralph Read, pastor